Gwon Seong-nak (born 19 December 1964) is a South Korean long-distance runner. He competed in the men's marathon at the 1988 Summer Olympics.

References

1964 births
Living people
Athletes (track and field) at the 1988 Summer Olympics
South Korean male long-distance runners
South Korean male marathon runners
Olympic athletes of South Korea
Place of birth missing (living people)
20th-century South Korean people